Habra Assembly constituency is an assembly constituency in North 24 Parganas district in the Indian state of West Bengal.

Overview
As per orders of the Delimitation Commission, No. 100 Habra Assembly constituency is composed of the following: Habra municipality, and Kumra, Pritibha, Rautara and Machhalandpur II gram panchayats of Habra I community development block.

Habra Assembly constituency is part of No. 17 Barasat (Lok Sabha constituency).

Members of Legislative Assembly

Election results

2021

2016

2011
In the 2011 election, Jyotipriya Mallick of Trinamool Congress defeated his nearest rival Pranab Bhattacharya  of CPI(M).

 

.# Swing calculated on Congress+Trinamool Congress vote percentages taken together in 2006.

1977-2006
In the 2006 Assembly elections, P K Bhattacharyya of CPI (M)  won the Habra assembly seat defeating his nearest rival Tapati Dutta of Trinamool Congress, who won the 2001 election defeating Amitava Nandy of CPI (M). Contests in most years were multi cornered but only winners and runners are being mentioned. In 1996, Baren Basu of CPI (M) defeated his nearest rival Abdul Hamid Mandal of Congress. In 1991 and 1987, Kamal Sengupta (Bose) of CPI (M) defeated Biman Dutta of Congress. In 1982 Nirode Roy Choudhury of CPI(M) defeated Biman Dutta of Congress. In 1977 Nirode Roy Choudhury of CPI (M) defeated his nearest rival Krishnadas Chattopadhyay of Congress.

1951-1972
Tarun Kanti Ghose of Congress won in 1972, 1971 and 1969. J.P.Mukherjee of Bangla Congress won in 1967. Tarun Kanti Ghose won in 1962,1957 and in independent India's first election in 1951.

References

Assembly constituencies of West Bengal
Politics of North 24 Parganas district